The West Indies are a subregion of North America and the island region of the North Atlantic Ocean and the Caribbean.

West Indies may also refer to:
 West Indies (film), an 1979 Algerian-Mauritanian film
 West Indies cricket team
 West Indies Federation, a short-lived Caribbean federation
 "West Indies", a 2021 song by Koffee

See also
 Dutch West India Company, a former chartered company of Dutch merchants
 East Indies
 East Indies (disambiguation)
 West Indian, an inhabitant of the West Indies
 The West Indian, a 1771 play by Richard Cumberland